John Daniel Cartano (April 4, 1909 - July 19, 2005) was an American lawyer.

Early life
Cartano was born on April 4, 1909, in Seattle, Washington, to Daniel A. and Margaret Cartano. He graduated from West Seattle High School in 1926, where he was honored as a commencement speaker and 3-year letterman in tennis and golf. At the age of 17, he became the Washington State's champion high school orator, and later placed third in the semifinals of the National Oratorical Contest, behind the former Speaker of the House of Representatives, Carl Albert. He graduated from the University of Washington, in 1930, where he served as vice-president of the student body and was a Phi Beta Kappa.

Career
Cartano received a doctor of law degree from Harvard Law School in 1934. He was the founder of the Seattle law firm of Cartano, Botzer & Chapman, where he worked for over 40 years. Cartano specialized in litigation, personal injury cases, and contract law.

Seattle civic activities
Cartano made his mark on the Seattle community as a prominent civic leader. He served as president of the Seattle Chamber of Commerce in 1961–1962.  He served as Vice President of the Seattle Chamber of Commerce in 1959–1960, was a member of the board of trustees and executive committee of the chamber from 1957 to 1960, and was honorary counsel from 1957 to 1959. He was a member of the Chamber's Speakers' Bureau and the Members' Council, Aviation and Political Participation Divisions.

Cartano was a member of the steering committee that brought the World's Fair to Seattle. He served as the campaign manager for Gen. Dwight Eisenhower's presidential campaign in the State of Washington in 1956 and was active in the Republican Party politics for many years. He was instrumental in obtaining the funding for the Space Needle and the Seattle Center.

His public service in Seattle included positions as a member of the Board of Directors of the Arthritis and Rheumatism Foundation, Chairman of the Seattle Chapter, United Nations Association, the United Good Neighbors Speakers Committee, President of the Seattle Chapter of the Naval Reserve Officer's Association and vice-president of the World Affairs Council. Cartano was a member of the Rainier Club, Washington Athletic Club, Harvard Club, College Club, Seattle Tennis Club, Breakfast Club, Speakers Club, Sigma Chi Fraternity, and Olympic Club. He and his wife Jane were members of Sacred Heart Church in Bellevue.

World War II 
Cartano served as a Navy Lieutenant and Lieutenant Commander in World War II, in both the Atlantic and Pacific.

His active military duty started in the Pacific where he commanded the USS APc-25 in 1943. He was awarded the Navy and Marine Corps Medal for, according to the citation, "heroism displayed in the rescue of approximately thirty-five survivors from a burning transport which had been subjected to an enemy aerial attack in the Solomon Islands area on August 13, 1943." A Radio Special, used as a promotional advertisement that was played nationally during World War II to recruit workers to build and rehabilitate vessels in the shipyards and to bolster national commitment to World War II, was transcribed as follows:

Cartano was later reassigned to the Atlantic where he joined the Destroyer Escort Fleet in June 1944 and served until peace was declared.  He was the Executive Officer and Navigator of the USS Durik in the Atlantic in 1944 and 1945.  He went aboard the Durik as a Lieutenant (j.g.) and then became a Lieutenant Commander.  The Durik sailed the Atlantic route with Liberty ships to the Mediterranean, including  Bizerte, Algiers and Sicily.  The Durik had orders to proceed to the Pacific Fleet to take part in the invasion of Japan when liberty was declared.  Cartano was discharged in November 1945.  He returned home to Seattle, and became President of the Seattle Chapter of the Reserve Officers Association for two years.

Family life
Cartano was married for 58 years to his wife, Jane Bronson Cartano, who died on May 1, 2005.  Jane earned a Masters of Science degree in Nutrition from Iowa State University in 1944. She came to Seattle as the Chief Nutritionist for the Washington State Dairy Council. She met John Cartano in Seattle in 1946. They married in Las Cruces, New Mexico on November 1, 1946, and settled in Bellevue.  Cartano celebrated his 58th wedding anniversary with Jane on November 1, 2004. Cartano was survived by seven children, 13 grandchildren, and three great-grandchildren.

References

External links
 Cartano family website

1909 births
Lawyers from Seattle
2005 deaths
Washington (state) lawyers
United States Navy officers
University of Washington alumni
Harvard Law School alumni
Recipients of the Navy and Marine Corps Medal
United States Navy personnel of World War II
20th-century American lawyers